Jafarpur is a census town in Barrackpore II CD Block in Barrackpore subdivision in North 24 Parganas district in the Indian state of West Bengal. It is close to Kolkata and also part of Kolkata Urban Agglomeration.

Geography

Location
It has an average elevation of 2 metres (7 feet).

Babanpur, Jafarpur, Mohanpur and Telenipara form a cluster of census towns around Barrackpore.

96% of the population of Barrackpore subdivision (partly presented in the map alongside) live in urban areas. In 2011, it had a density of population of 10,967 per km2. The subdivision has 16 municipalities and 24 census towns.

For most of the cities/ towns information regarding density of population is available in the Infobox. Population data is not available for neighbourhoods. It is available for the entire Municipal area and thereafter ward-wise.

All places marked on the map are linked in the full-screen map.

Police station
Khardaha & Titagarh police station under Barrackpore Police Commissionerate has jurisdiction over Khardaha Municipal area and Barrackpore II CD Block.

Post Office
Jaffarpur has a non-delivery sub post office, with PIN 700122 in the North Presidency Division of North 24 Parganas district in Calcutta region. Other post offices with the same PIN are Nonachandanpukur and Anandapuri.

Demographics

Population
As per 2011 Census of India Jafarpur had a total population of 19,062, of which 9,724 (51%) were males and 9,338 (49%) were females. Population below 6 years was 1,361. The total number of literates in Jaffarpur was 16,598 (93.77% of the population over 6 years).

 India census, Jafarpur had a population of 14,032. Males constitute 53% of the population and females 47%. Jafarpur has an average literacy rate of 86%, higher than the national average of 59.5%: male literacy is 89% and female literacy is 83%. In Jafarpur, 7% of the population is under 6 years of age.

Kolkata Urban Agglomeration
The following Municipalities, Census Towns and other locations in Barrackpore subdivision were part of Kolkata Urban Agglomeration in the 2011 census: Kanchrapara (M), Jetia (CT), Halisahar (M), Balibhara (CT), Naihati (M), Bhatpara (M), Kaugachhi (CT), Garshyamnagar (CT), Garulia (M), Ichhapur Defence Estate (CT), North Barrackpur (M), Barrackpur Cantonment (CB), Barrackpore (M), Jafarpur (CT), Ruiya (CT), Titagarh (M), Khardaha (M), Bandipur (CT), Panihati (M), Muragachha (CT) New Barrackpore (M), Chandpur (CT), Talbandha (CT), Patulia (CT), Kamarhati (M), Baranagar (M), South Dumdum (M), North Dumdum (M), Dum Dum (M), Noapara (CT), Babanpur (CT), Teghari (CT), Nanna (OG), Chakla (OG), Srotribati (OG) and Panpur (OG).

Infrastructure
As per the District Census Handbook 2011, Jafarpur covered an area of 1.98 km2. Amongst the medical facilities it had were 7 medicine shops, Amongst the educational facilities it had were 8 primary schools, 3 middle schools, 3 secondary schools and 1 senior secondary school.

Transport
Jafarpur is on Kalyani Expressway.

The Palta railway station on the Sealdah-Ranaghat line is located nearby.

Education
Jaffarpur Charaktala Girls’ High School has facilities for teaching up to Class X. It was established in 1959.

Healthcare
North 24 Parganas district has been identified as one of the areas where ground water is affected by arsenic contamination.

References

Cities and towns in North 24 Parganas district
Neighbourhoods in Kolkata